A reply girl was a type of female YouTube user who uploaded video responses to popular YouTube videos, at a time when such responses were displayed prominently by the site.

Algorithm
In 2012, YouTube gave significant weight to video responses when suggesting further viewing for any given video, putting them "almost automatically" at the top of the list. Users known as "reply girls" realised that by responding to popular videos, such as those featured on the YouTube home page, their own content could receive a significant audience. By selecting a suggestive thumbnail for the response, often filmed in a push-up bra or low-cut top, posters could encourage viewers to click the image and view the video. Although many users would click the "dislike" button on the videos, this was interpreted by YouTube's algorithm as legitimate engagement, and the videos would be ranked more highly. 

Prior to YouTube and social media, companies were promoting their products through the television, radio, or newspaper. The abuse of YouTube's algorithm through the use of "sexually suggestive thumbnails" would allow for the monetization of the reply girl's content. The YouTube algorithm would be utilized by companies to detect which influencer would attract a larger audience.

History and dispute
With YouTube rewarding users for large numbers of video views, reply girls were able to earn significant income by exploiting this aspect of the website. Alejandra Gaitan was thought to be earning around a hundred dollars for each of the "short, rambling [and] usually pointless" videos that she posted, with some of the more popular ones raising close to a thousand. Gaitan's username for her channel was "thereplygirl" and her videos were formatted as Re: [Title of trending video] which would result in her video having priority because the previous YouTube algorithm would suggest videos that were correlated or similar to the previous video watched by the viewer. Megan Lee Heart, whose YouTube channel reached 38,000 subscribers and had over 47 million views at the time, made tens of thousands of dollars, claiming to have made $80,000 on her channel page description. Heart, who uploaded her Pointless Reviews under the username "MeganSpeaks" included thumbnails featuring bright arrows pointing toward her chest. Heart stated she began the series not to attract views, but to mock Gaitan. Like Gaitan, Heart also attracted controversy on YouTube, but stated that Pointless Reviews is "kind of troilling".

In response to Gaitan manipulating the YouTube algorithm, YouTube users uploaded "anti-reply girl" videos in protest of the low quality but high quantity of videos posted by reply girls. Male YouTube users would make a mockery of the reply girls by exposing their chest as well and expressing their distaste towards the content being produced. The revolt was addressing the spamming of the platform along with the fact that videos of content creators who were creating original content were being neglected by the YouTube algorithm. The platform would be spammed because followers of Gaitan began to acknowledge the profits that she would receive and wanted to jump on the bandwagon. Being a reply girl became known as an easier way to make money on YouTube. 

In March 2012, YouTube updated its algorithm to give less weight to suggested videos which were only watched briefly by users, announcing that the site would be "focusing more prominently on time watched". Gaitan expressed concern that this would "kill almost every reply channel", despite that being the stated intention of the action. YouTube previously wanted to base the value off of view count because they believed it would "reward great videos" and although this was true to some extent, it excluded a variety of factors. For example, clickbait became prominent amongst content creators who were aspiring to increase the monetary value of their video; although the video will most likely be clicked on, viewers had a tendency to leave at an earlier time due to the lack of correlation between the video and title or the fact that the video will address the title of the video after an excess amount of time. Reply girls would also misuse the algorithm that focused on view count by attracting viewers through provocative thumbnails, therefore, misleading the actual concept of the video.

References

YouTube
2010s in Internet culture
Internet terminology
Internet memes introduced in 2012